El Maton is an unincorporated community in Matagorda County, Texas, United States. It is in the areas of Farm to Market Road 1095, 459, and State Highway 35, along the Union Pacific Railroad.

The Tidehaven Independent School District serves area students.

The designated community college for Tidehaven ISD is Wharton County Junior College.

References

External links

 

Unincorporated communities in Texas
Unincorporated communities in Matagorda County, Texas